Chantal Wright (born 1 February 1993) is an American judoka, though she has previously competed for both Switzerland and the United Kingdom.

She won the 70 kg categories at the 2016 Pan American Open in San Salvador and the 2017 Pan American Open in Buenos Aires, and came second at the 2018 Pan American Open in Santo Domingo.

Wright won bronze at both the 2020 and the 2021 Pan American Judo Championships. She also competed at the 2021 World Judo Championships in the 70kg category, but was knocked out by Dutch judoka Sanne van Dijke.

Personal life
Wright's two younger siblings, Kyle and Liam, also compete in judo competitions; all three are trained by their father.

Throughout the COVID-19 pandemic, Wright worked as an intensive care nurse.

References

1993 births
Living people
American female judoka
21st-century American women